Nebria peristerica is a species of ground beetle in the Nebriinae family that can be found in Greece and North Macedonia.

References

Beetles described in 1901
Beetles of Europe